The Lepidoptera of the Canary Islands consist of both the butterflies and moths recorded from the Canary Islands.

According to a recent estimate, there are a total of about 710 Lepidoptera species present in the Canary Islands.

Butterflies

Hesperiidae
Thymelicus acteon christi Rebel, 1894 (uncertain taxonomic status)

Lycaenidae
Aricia cramera Eschscholtz, 1821
Azanus ubaldus (Stoll, 1782)
Cacyreus marshalli Butler, 1898
Lampides boeticus (Linnaeus, 1767)
Leptotes pirithous (Linnaeus, 1767)
Leptotes webbianus (Brulle, 1839)
Lycaena phlaeas (Linnaeus, 1761)
Polyommatus celina (Austaut, 1879)
Zizeeria knysna (Trimen, 1862)

Nymphalidae
Argynnis pandora (Denis & Schiffermuller, 1775)
Danaus chrysippus (Linnaeus, 1758)
Danaus plexippus (Linnaeus, 1758)
Hipparchia wyssii bacchus Higgins, 1967
Hipparchia wyssii gomera Higgins, 1967
Hipparchia wyssii tamadabae Owen & Smith, 1992
Hipparchia wyssii tilosi Manil, 1984
Hipparchia wyssii wyssii  (Christ, 1889)
Hypolimnas misippus (Linnaeus, 1764)
Issoria lathonia (Linnaeus, 1758)
Maniola jurtina (Linnaeus, 1758)
Pararge xiphioides Staudinger, 1871
Vanessa atalanta (Linnaeus, 1758)
Vanessa cardui (Linnaeus, 1758)
Vanessa virginiensis (Drury, 1773)
Vanessa vulcania (Godart, 1819)

Pieridae
Catopsilia florella (Fabricius, 1775)
Colias croceus (Fourcroy, 1785)
Euchloe charlonia (Donzel, 1842)
Euchloe belemia eversi Stamm, 1963
Euchloe belemia grancanariensis Acosta, 2008
Euchloe belemia hesperidum Rothschild, 1913
Gonepteryx cleobule (Hübner, 1830)
Pieris cheiranthi (Hübner, 1808)
Pieris rapae (Linnaeus, 1758)
Pontia daplidice (Linnaeus, 1758)

Moths

Alucitidae
Alucita canariensis Scholz & Jackh, 1994

Autostichidae
Ambloma brachyptera Walsingham, 1908
Ambloma klimeschi Gozmany, 1975
Apatema fasciata (Stainton, 1859)
Apatema junnilaineni Vives, 2001
Apatema lucidum Walsingham, 1908
Apatema mediopallidum Walsingham, 1900
Chersogenes victimella Walsingham, 1908
Dysallomima coarctella (Rebel, 1896)
Epanastasis canariensis (Rebel, 1906)
Epanastasis eupracta Gozmany, 1988
Epanastasis excellens Gozmany, 1977
Epanastasis sophroniellus (Rebel, 1895)
Holcopogon bubulcellus (Staudinger, 1859)
Oecia oecophila (Staudinger, 1876)

Bedelliidae
Bedellia silvicolella Klimesch, 1968
Bedellia somnulentella (Zeller, 1847)

Blastobasidae
Blastobasis exclusa (Walsingham, 1908)
Blastobasis helleri Rebel, 1910
Blastobasis insularis (Wollaston, 1858)
Blastobasis marmorosella (Wollaston, 1858)
Blastobasis phycidella (Zeller, 1839)
Blastobasis rubiginosella Rebel, 1896
Blastobasis velutina Walsingham, 1908
Zenodochium polyphagum Walsingham, 1908
Zenodochium sostra Walsingham, 1910

Bucculatricidae
Bucculatrix canariensis Walsingham, 1908
Bucculatrix chrysanthemella Rebel, 1896
Bucculatrix phagnalella Walsingham, 1908

Carposinidae
Carposina cinderella Diakonoff, 1989
Carposina gigantella Rebel, 1917
Carposina sublucida Diakonoff, 1988

Choreutidae
Choreutis nemorana (Hübner, 1799)
Tebenna micalis (Mann, 1857)

Coleophoridae
Coleophora aegyptiacae Walsingham, 1907
Coleophora albidorsella Toll, 1942
Coleophora areniphila Toll, 1957
Coleophora aularia Meyrick, 1924
Coleophora confluella Rebel, 1892
Coleophora discomaculella Toll & Amsel, 1967
Coleophora gibberosa Baldizzone, 2003
Coleophora gracilella Toll, 1952
Coleophora granulatella Zeller, 1849
Coleophora haoma Baldizzone, 1994
Coleophora internitens Baldizzone & van der Wolf, 1999
Coleophora hospitiella Chretien, 1915
Coleophora hystricella Toll, 1957
Coleophora lassella Staudinger, 1859
Coleophora loti Falkovitsh, 1978
Coleophora microalbella Amsel, 1935
Coleophora micromeriae Walsingham, 1908
Coleophora neglecta Baldizzone, 1997
Coleophora orotavensis Rebel, 1896
Coleophora pinkeri Baldizzone, 1982
Coleophora polycarpaeae Hering, 1927
Coleophora pseudopoecilella Klimesch, 1982
Coleophora salicorniae Heinemann & Wocke, 1877
Coleophora salviella Chretien, 1916
Coleophora sarehma Toll, 1956
Coleophora semicinerea Staudinger, 1859
Coleophora teneriffella Baldizzone, 1987
Coleophora versurella Zeller, 1849
Ischnophanes canariella Baldizzone, 1984

Cosmopterigidae
Anatrachyntis badia (Hodges, 1962)
Anatrachyntis rileyi (Walsingham, 1882)
Ascalenia acaciella Chretien, 1915
Ascalenia vanella (Frey, 1860)
Coccidiphila gerasimovi Danilevsky, 1950
Coccidiphila kasypinkeri Traugott-Olsen, 1986
Coccidiphila ledereriella (Zeller, 1850)
Coccidiphila patriciae J. Nel & A. Nel, 2000
Coccidiphila riedli Traugott-Olsen, 1986
Cosmopterix attenuatella (Walker, 1864)
Cosmopterix coryphaea Walsingham, 1908
Cosmopterix crassicervicella Chretien, 1896
Cosmopterix pulchrimella Chambers, 1875
Cosmopterix turbidella Rebel, 1896
Eteobalea thaumatella (Walsingham, 1907)
Hodgesiella rhodorrhisella (Kasy, 1970)
Pyroderces argyrogrammos (Zeller, 1847)

Cossidae
Stygia hades Le Cerf, 1924
Stygia nilssoni Saldaitis & Yakovlev, 2008
Wiltshirocossus aries (Pungeler, 1902)

Crambidae
Agriphila tersellus (Lederer, 1855)
Agriphila trabeatellus (Herrich-Schäffer, 1848)
Ancylolomia palpella (Denis & Schiffermuller, 1775)
Ancylolomia tripolitella Rebel, 1909
Antigastra catalaunalis (Duponchel, 1833)
Aporodes floralis (Hübner, 1809)
Arnia nervosalis Guenee, 1849
Botyodes diniasalis (Walker, 1859)
Cataonia erubescens (Christoph, 1877)
Cornifrons ulceratalis Lederer, 1858
Cynaeda dentalis (Denis & Schiffermuller, 1775)
Dentifovea praecultalis (Rebel, 1896)
Diaphania indica (Saunders, 1851)
Diasemiopsis ramburialis (Duponchel, 1834)
Diplopseustis perieresalis (Walker, 1859)
Dolicharthria heringi (Rebel, 1939)
Duponchelia fovealis Zeller, 1847
Ecpyrrhorrhoe diffusalis (Guenee, 1854)
Euchromius cambridgei (Zeller, 1867)
Euchromius ocellea (Haworth, 1811)
Euchromius vinculellus (Zeller, 1847)
Eudonia angustea (Curtis, 1827)
Eudonia decorella (Stainton, 1859)
Eudonia geminoflexuosa Nuss, Karsholt & Meyer, 1998
Eudonia lineola (Curtis, 1827)
Eudonia parviangusta Nuss, Karsholt & Meyer, 1998
Evergestis desertalis (Hübner, 1813)
Evergestis isatidalis (Duponchel, 1833)
Hellula undalis (Fabricius, 1781)
Herpetogramma basalis (Walker, 1866)
Herpetogramma licarsisalis (Walker, 1859)
Hodebertia testalis (Fabricius, 1794)
Hydriris ornatalis (Duponchel, 1832)
Loxostege deliblatica Szent-Ivany & Uhrik-Meszaros, 1942
Mecyna asinalis (Hübner, 1819)
Mecyna atlanticum (Bethune-Baker, 1894)
Mesocrambus canariensis Ganev, 1987
Mesocrambus tamsi Błeszyński, 1960
Metasia suppandalis (Hübner, 1823)
Nomophila noctuella (Denis & Schiffermuller, 1775)
Palepicorsia ustrinalis (Christoph, 1877)
Palpita vitrealis (Rossi, 1794)
Parapediasia teterrellus (Zincken, 1821)
Prionapteryx lancerotella (Rebel, 1892)
Pseudobissetia terrestrellus (Christoph, 1885)
Pyrausta aurata (Scopoli, 1763)
Pyrausta sanguinalis (Linnaeus, 1767)
Sitochroa palealis (Denis & Schiffermuller, 1775)
Spoladea recurvalis (Fabricius, 1775)
Trichophysetis whitei Rebel, 1906
Udea ferrugalis (Hübner, 1796)
Udea nordmanni (Rebel, 1935)
Udea numeralis (Hübner, 1796)
Uresiphita gilvata (Fabricius, 1794)

Elachistidae
Agonopterix cinerariae Walsingham, 1908
Agonopterix heracliana (Linnaeus, 1758)
Agonopterix mutatella Hannemann, 1989
Agonopterix nodiflorella (Milliere, 1866)
Agonopterix perezi Walsingham, 1908
Agonopterix vendettella (Chretien, 1908)
Agonopterix yeatiana (Fabricius, 1781)
Depressaria absynthiella Herrich-Schäffer, 1865
Depressaria daucella (Denis & Schiffermuller, 1775)
Depressaria discipunctella Herrich-Schäffer, 1854
Depressaria veneficella Zeller, 1847
Elachista canariella Nielsen & Traugott-Olsen, 1987
Elachista contaminatella Zeller, 1847
Ethmia bipunctella (Fabricius, 1775)
Ethmia quadrinotella (Mann, 1861)
Exaeretia conciliatella (Rebel, 1892)
Perittia carlinella (Walsingham, 1908)
Perittia echiella (de Joannis, 1902)
Stephensia cedronellae (Walsingham, 1908)

Epermeniidae
Epermenia aequidentellus (E. Hofmann, 1867)
Epermenia strictellus (Wocke, 1867)

Erebidae
Anomis erosa Hübner, 1810
Anomis flava (Fabricius, 1775)
Anumeta hilgerti (Rothschild, 1909)
Autophila dilucida (Hübner, 1808)
Autophila rosea (Staudinger, 1888)
Canararctia rufescens (Brulle, 1836)
Cerocala algiriae Oberthur, 1876
Clytie illunaris (Hübner, 1813)
Dicallomera fortunata (Rogenhofer, 1891)
Drasteria philippina (Austadt, 1880)
Eilema albicosta (Rogenhofer, 1894)
Eublemma baccalix (Swinhoe, 1886)
Eublemma cochylioides (Guenee, 1852)
Eublemma ostrina (Hübner, 1808)
Eublemma parva (Hübner, 1808)
Eublemma scitula Rambur, 1833
Gnamptonyx innexa (Walker, 1858)
Grammodes stolida (Fabricius, 1775)
Hypena lividalis (Hübner, 1796)
Hypena obacerralis Walker, 1859
Hypena obsitalis (Hübner, 1813)
Metachrostis velox (Hübner, 1813)
Ophiusa tirhaca (Cramer, 1773)
Pandesma robusta (Walker, 1858)
Rhynchina canariensis Pinker, 1962
Schrankia costaestrigalis (Stephens, 1834)
Tathorhynchus exsiccata (Lederer, 1855)
Utetheisa pulchella (Linnaeus, 1758)

Euteliidae
Eutelia adulatrix (Hübner, 1813)

Gelechiidae
Anarsia acaciae Walsingham, 1896
Aproaerema anthyllidella (Hübner, 1813)
Aproaerema mercedella Walsingham, 1908
Aroga aristotelis (Milliere, 1876)
Athrips fagoniae (Walsingham, 1904)
Bryotropha domestica (Haworth, 1828)
Bryotropha plebejella (Zeller, 1847)
Carpatolechia decorella (Haworth, 1812)
Caryocolum sciurella (Walsingham, 1908)
Chrysoesthia bosae (Walsingham, 1908)
Crossobela trinotella (Herrich-Schäffer, 1856)
Dichomeris acuminatus (Staudinger, 1876)
Dichomeris lamprostoma (Zeller, 1847)
Ephysteris promptella (Staudinger, 1859)
Epidola stigma Staudinger, 1859
Gelechia sabinellus (Zeller, 1839)
Helcystogramma convolvuli (Walsingham, 1908)
Mesophleps corsicella Herrich-Schäffer, 1856
Mesophleps oxycedrella (Milliere, 1871)
Metzneria aestivella (Zeller, 1839)
Metzneria castiliella (Moschler, 1866)
Metzneria tenuiella (Mann, 1864)
Metzneria torosulella (Rebel, 1893)
Microlechia chretieni Turati, 1924
Microlechia klimeschi (Povolny, 1972)
Microlechia rhamnifoliae (Amsel & Hering, 1931)
Monochroa rebeli (M. Hering, 1927)
Neotelphusa cisti (Stainton, 1869)
Nothris congressariella (Bruand, 1858)
Ochrodia subdiminutella (Stainton, 1867)
Ornativalva antipyramis (Meyrick, 1925)
Ornativalva heluanensis (Debski, 1913)
Ornativalva plutelliformis (Staudinger, 1859)
Palumbina guerinii (Stainton, 1858)
Phthorimaea operculella (Zeller, 1873)
Platyedra subcinerea (Haworth, 1828)
Pragmatodes fruticosella Walsingham, 1908
Ptocheuusa guimarensis (Walsingham, 1908)
Recurvaria cinerella Chretien, 1908
Scrobipalpa bazae Povolny, 1977
Scrobipalpa ergasima (Meyrick, 1916)
Scrobipalpa halymella (Milliere, 1864)
Scrobipalpa instabilella (Douglas, 1846)
Scrobipalpa ocellatella (Boyd, 1858)
Scrobipalpa traganella (Chretien, 1915)
Scrobipalpa vasconiella (Rossler, 1877)
Scrobipalpa vicaria (Meyrick, 1921)
Scrobipalpa wiltshirei Povolny, 1966
Sitotroga cerealella (Olivier, 1789)
Stomopteryx detersella (Zeller, 1847)
Stomopteryx remissella (Zeller, 1847)
Stomopteryx schizogynae (Walsingham, 1908)
Streyella canariensis (Walsingham, 1908)
Syncopacma genistae (Walsingham, 1908)
Syncopacma polychromella (Rebel, 1902)
Syncopacma thaumalea (Walsingham, 1905)
Tecia solanivora (Povolny, 1973)
Teleiopsis lunariella (Walsingham, 1908)
Telphusa cistiflorella (Constant, 1890)

Geometridae
Anticlea cabrerai (Pinker, 1962)
Ascotis fortunata (Blachier, 1887)
Aspitates collinaria (Holt-White, 1894)
Charissa canariensis (Rebel, 1911)
Chemerina caliginearia (Rambur, 1833)
Chiasmia aestimaria (Hübner, 1809)
Cleora fortunata Blachier, 1889
Costaconvexa centrostrigaria (Wollaston, 1858)
Crocallis bacalladoi Pinker, 1978
Crocallis matillae Pinker, 1974
Cyclophora maderensis (Bethune-Baker, 1891)
Episauris kiliani Rebel, 1898
Eumannia bytinskii (Wehrli, 1939)
Eupithecia boryata (Rebel, 1906)
Eupithecia gomerensis (Rebel, 1917)
Eupithecia maspalomae Pinker, 1961
Eupithecia massiliata Milliere, 1865
Eupithecia orana Dietze, 1913
Eupithecia pantellata Milliere, 1875
Eupithecia phoeniceata (Rambur, 1834)
Eupithecia pusillata (Denis & Schiffermuller, 1775)
Eupithecia rosai Pinker, 1962
Eupithecia schuetzeata Pinker, 1961
Eupithecia semigraphata Bruand, 1850
Eupithecia stertzi (Rebel, 1911)
Eupithecia tenerifensis (Rebel, 1906)
Eupithecia ultimaria Boisduval, 1840
Eupithecia unedonata Mabille, 1868
Gymnoscelis rufifasciata (Haworth, 1809)
Herbulotina grandis (Prout, 1914)
Idaea abnorma (Pinker, 1960)
Idaea bacalladoi (Pinker, 1974)
Idaea blaesii Lenz & Hausmann, 1992
Idaea charitata (Rebel, 1914)
Idaea fuerteventurensis (Pinker, 1974)
Idaea inquinata (Scopoli, 1763)
Idaea longaria (Herrich-Schäffer, 1852)
Idaea neglecta Hausmann & Werno, 2003
Idaea nigra Hausmann & Blasius, 2007
Idaea palmata (Staudinger, 1901)
Idaea purpurariata (Pinker, 1974)
Idaea unicalcarata (Prout, 1922)
Idaea vilaflorensis (Rebel, 1910)
Idaea volloni (D. Lucas & de Joannis, 1907)
Isturgia disputaria (Guenee, 1858)
Isturgia pulinda (Walker, 1860)
Isturgia tennoa (Pinker, 1978)
Menophra canariensis (Rebel, 1917)
Microloxia schmitzi Hausmann, 1995
Microloxia simonyi (Rebel, 1894)
Nebula ibericata (Staudinger, 1871)
Nycterosea obstipata (Fabricius, 1794)
Oar pratana (Fabricius, 1794)
Phaiogramma faustinata (Milliere, 1868)
Rhodometra sacraria (Linnaeus, 1767)
Rhoptria asperaria (Hübner, 1817)
Scopula asellaria (Herrich-Schäffer, 1847)
Scopula guancharia (Alphéraky, 1889)
Scopula imitaria (Hübner, 1799)
Scopula minorata (Boisduval, 1833)
Scopula submutata (Treitschke, 1828)
Tephronia codetaria (Oberthur, 1881)
Xanthorhoe ferrugata (Clerck, 1759)

Glyphipterigidae
Acrolepiopsis vesperella (Zeller, 1850)
Digitivalva pappella (Walsingham, 1908)
Glyphipterix equitella (Scopoli, 1763)
Glyphipterix fortunatella Walsingham, 1908
Glyphipterix pygmaeella Rebel, 1896
Glyphipterix umbilici M. Hering, 1927

Gracillariidae
Aspilapteryx multipunctella Chretien, 1916
Caloptilia aurantiaca (Wollaston, 1858)
Caloptilia coruscans (Walsingham, 1907)
Caloptilia laurifoliae (M. Hering, 1927)
Caloptilia robustella Jackh, 1972
Caloptilia staintoni (Wollaston, 1858)
Dialectica hedemanni (Rebel, 1896)
Dialectica scalariella (Zeller, 1850)
Leucospilapteryx omissella (Stainton, 1848)
Phyllocnistis canariensis M. Hering, 1927
Phyllocnistis citrella Stainton, 1856
Phyllonorycter bartolomella (Deschka, 1968)
Phyllonorycter cytisella (Rebel, 1896)
Phyllonorycter cytisifoliae (M. Hering, 1927)
Phyllonorycter foliolosi Walsingham, 1908
Phyllonorycter juncei (Walsingham, 1908)
Phyllonorycter klimeschiella (Deschka, 1970)
Phyllonorycter messaniella (Zeller, 1846)
Phyllonorycter spartocytisi (M. Hering, 1927)

Nepticulidae
Acalyptris staticis (Walsingham, 1908)
Ectoedemia jubae (Walsingham, 1908)
Ectoedemia nigrifasciata (Walsingham, 1908)
Ectoedemia variicapitella (Chretien, 1908)
Stigmella anomalella (Goeze, 1783)
Stigmella aurella (Fabricius, 1775)
Stigmella centifoliella (Zeller, 1848)
Stigmella crenulatae (Klimesch, 1975)
Stigmella xystodes (Meyrick, 1916)
Trifurcula micromeriae (Walsingham, 1908)
Trifurcula salicinae Klimesch, 1975
Trifurcula sanctaecrucis (Walsingham, 1908)
Trifurcula ridiculosa (Walsingham, 1908)

Noctuidae
Abrostola canariensis Hampson, 1913
Acontia biskrensis Oberthur, 1887
Acontia lucida (Hufnagel, 1766)
Acrobyla kneuckeri Rebel, 1903
Actebia photophila (Guenee, 1852)
Agrotis correlejoi Fibiger & Honey, 2004
Agrotis fortunata Draudt, 1938
Agrotis haifae Staudinger, 1897
Agrotis herzogi Rebel, 1911
Agrotis ipsilon (Hufnagel, 1766)
Agrotis lanzarotensis Rebel, 1894
Agrotis lasserrei (Oberthur, 1881)
Agrotis puta (Hübner, 1803)
Agrotis sardzeana Brandt, 1941
Agrotis segetum (Denis & Schiffermuller, 1775)
Agrotis spinifera (Hübner, 1808)
Agrotis trux (Hübner, 1824)
Anarta sodae (Rambur, 1829)
Anarta trifolii (Hufnagel, 1766)
Argyrogramma fracta (Walker, 1858)
Argyrogramma signata (Fabricius, 1775)
Armada panaceorum (Menetries, 1848)
Autographa gamma (Linnaeus, 1758)
Bryonycta opulenta Boursin, 1957
Callopistria latreillei (Duponchel, 1827)
Calophasia platyptera (Esper, 1788)
Caradrina oberthuri (Rothschild, 1913)
Caradrina flava Oberthur, 1876
Caradrina rebeli Staudinger, 1901
Cardepia affinis (Rothschild, 1913)
Chrysodeixis acuta (Walker, 1858)
Chrysodeixis chalcites (Esper, 1789)
Cleonymia baetica (Rambur, 1837)
Condica capensis (Walker, 1857)
Condica viscosa (Freyer, 1831)
Cornutiplusia circumflexa (Linnaeus, 1767)
Cosmia affinis (Linnaeus, 1767)
Ctenoplusia limbirena (Guenee, 1852)
Ctenoplusia vittata (Wallengren, 1856)
Cucullia calendulae Treitschke, 1835
Cucullia syrtana Mabille, 1888
Cucullia canariensis Pinker, 1968
Euplexia euplexina Rebel, 1917
Euxoa beatissima Rebel, 1913
Euxoa canariensis Rebel, 1902
Galgula partita Guenee, 1852
Gerarctia poliotis Hampson, 1905
Gortyna xanthenes Germar, 1842
Hadena perplexa (Denis & Schiffermuller, 1775)
Hadena sancta (Staudinger, 1859)
Hadena nigricata Pinker, 1968
Hadena silenides (Staudinger, 1895)
Hecatera weissi (Draudt, 1934)
Helicoverpa armigera (Hübner, 1808)
Heliothis incarnata Freyer, 1838
Heliothis nubigera Herrich-Schäffer, 1851
Heliothis peltigera (Denis & Schiffermuller, 1775)
Heliothis viriplaca (Hufnagel, 1766)
Leucania loreyi (Duponchel, 1827)
Leucania fortunata Pinker, 1961
Leucania punctosa (Treitschke, 1825)
Leucochlaena oditis (Hübner, 1822)
Mesapamea pinkeri Bacallardo, 1973
Metopoceras felicina (Donzel, 1844)
Mniotype fratellum (Pinker, 1965)
Mniotype schumacheri (Rebel, 1917)
Mniotype usurpatrix (Rebel, 1914)
Mythimna saucesa Pinker, 1963
Mythimna vitellina (Hübner, 1808)
Mythimna unipuncta (Haworth, 1809)
Noctua noacki Boursin, 1957
Noctua pronuba (Linnaeus, 1758)
Nyctobrya canaria Alphéraky, 1889
Nyctobrya simonyi Rogenhofer, 1889
Oria musculosa (Hübner, 1808)
Ozarba heliastis (Hampson, 1902)
Paranataelia tenerifica (Hampson, 1906)
Paranataelia whitei (Rebel, 1906)
Peridroma saucia (Hübner, 1808)
Phlogophora meticulosa (Linnaeus, 1758)
Polymixis lichenea (Hübner, 1813)
Polymixis bacheri (Pungeler, 1901)
Polytela cliens (Felder & Rogenhofer, 1874)
Scythocentropus inquinata (Mabille, 1888)
Sesamia cretica Lederer, 1857
Sesamia nonagrioides Lefebvre, 1827
Spodoptera cilium Guenee, 1852
Spodoptera exigua (Hübner, 1808)
Spodoptera littoralis (Boisduval, 1833)
Thalerastria diaphora (Staudinger, 1879)
Thysanoplusia orichalcea (Fabricius, 1775)
Trichoplusia ni (Hübner, 1803)
Xestia c-nigrum (Linnaeus, 1758)
Xestia mejiasi Pinker, 1961
Xylena exsoleta (Linnaeus, 1758)

Nolidae
Earias insulana (Boisduval, 1833)
Garella nilotica (Rogenhofer, 1882)

Notodontidae
Cerura delavoiei (Gaschet, 1876)

Oecophoridae
Harpella forficella (Scopoli, 1763)

Plutellidae
Plutella xylostella (Linnaeus, 1758)
Rhigognostis annulatella (Curtis, 1832)

Praydidae
Prays citri (Milliere, 1873)
Prays friesei Klimesch, 1992
Prays oleae (Bernard, 1788)
Amicta cabrerai (Rebel, 1894)

Psychidae
Luffia ferchaultella (Stephens, 1850)
Luffia gomerensis Henderickx, 1996
Luffia palmensis Sobczyk, 2002
Luffia rebeli Walsingham, 1908

Pterophoridae
Agdistis bifurcatus Agenjo, 1952
Agdistis frankeniae (Zeller, 1847)
Agdistis heydeni (Zeller, 1852)
Agdistis meridionalis (Zeller, 1847)
Agdistis pseudocanariensis Arenberger, 1973
Agdistis salsolae Walsingham, 1908
Agdistis satanas Milliere, 1875
Agdistis tamaricis (Zeller, 1847)
Amblyptilia acanthadactyla (Hübner, 1813)
Crombrugghia distans (Zeller, 1847)
Crombrugghia laetus (Zeller, 1847)
Emmelina monodactyla (Linnaeus, 1758)
Hellinsia inulae (Zeller, 1852)
Hellinsia pectodactylus (Staudinger, 1859)
Lantanophaga pusillidactylus (Walker, 1864)
Merrifieldia bystropogonis (Walsingham, 1908)
Merrifieldia chordodactylus (Staudinger, 1859)
Merrifieldia hedemanni (Rebel, 1896)
Merrifieldia malacodactylus (Zeller, 1847)
Merrifieldia particiliata (Walsingham, 1908)
Oxyptilus parvidactyla (Haworth, 1811)
Puerphorus olbiadactylus (Milliere, 1859)
Stangeia siceliota (Zeller, 1847)
Stenoptilia bipunctidactyla (Scopoli, 1763)
Stenoptilodes taprobanes (Felder & Rogenhofer, 1875)
Tabulaephorus punctinervis (Constant, 1885)

Pyralidae
Acrobasis klimeschi Roesler, 1978
Acrobasis obliqua (Zeller, 1847)
Aglossa caprealis (Hübner, 1809)
Aglossa pinguinalis (Linnaeus, 1758)
Ambluncus nervosellus Meyrick, 1934
Ancylodes dealbatella (Erschoff, 1874)
Ancylodes pallens Ragonot, 1887
Ancylosis arenosella (Staudinger, 1859)
Ancylosis biflexella (Lederer, 1855)
Ancylosis convexella (Lederer, 1855)
Ancylosis costistrigella (Ragonot, 1890)
Ancylosis faustinella (Zeller, 1867)
Ancylosis gracilella Ragonot, 1887
Ancylosis harmoniella (Ragonot, 1887)
Ancylosis imitella Hampson, 1901
Ancylosis nubeculella (Ragonot, 1887)
Ancylosis oblitella (Zeller, 1848)
Ancylosis roscidella (Eversmann, 1844)
Ancylosis samaritanella (Zeller, 1867)
Ancylosis yerburii (Butler, 1884)
Aphomia sociella (Linnaeus, 1758)
Apomyelois ceratoniae (Zeller, 1839)
Archigalleria proavitella (Rebel, 1892)
Arsissa atlantica Asselbergs, 2009
Bazaria gilvella (Ragonot, 1887)
Bazaria venosella Asselbergs, 2009
Bostra obsoletalis (Mann, 1884)
Bradyrrhoa trapezella (Duponchel, 1836)
Cadra calidella (Guenee, 1845)
Cadra cautella (Walker, 1863)
Cadra figulilella (Gregson, 1871)
Caina deletella Ragonot, 1893
Cathayia insularum (Speidel & Schmitz, 1991)
Cherchera abatesella Dumont, 1932
Cryptoblabes gnidiella (Milliere, 1867)
Denticera divisella (Duponchel, 1842)
Dioryctria nivaliensis Rebel, 1892
Endotricha rogenhoferi Rebel, 1892
Ephestia disparella Hampson, 1901
Ephestia elutella (Hübner, 1796)
Ephestia kuehniella Zeller, 1879
Epischnia hesperidella Rebel, 1917
Etiella zinckenella (Treitschke, 1832)
Euzopherodes vapidella (Mann, 1857)
Faveria dionysia (Zeller, 1846)
Galleria mellonella (Linnaeus, 1758)
Hansreisseria gilvescens (Rebel, 1917)
Homoeosoma nimbella (Duponchel, 1837)
Hypotia corticalis (Denis & Schiffermuller, 1775)
Hypotia infulalis Lederer, 1858
Hypotia muscosalis (Rebel, 1917)
Hypotia myalis (Rothschild, 1913)
Hypotia pectinalis (Herrich-Schäffer, 1838)
Isauria dilucidella (Duponchel, 1836)
Laetilia loxogramma (Staudinger, 1870)
Lamoria anella (Denis & Schiffermuller, 1775)
Merulempista turturella (Zeller, 1848)
Nephopterygia austeritella Amsel, 1965
Oxybia transversella (Duponchel, 1836)
Pararotruda nesiotica (Rebel, 1911)
Pempelia brephiella (Staudinger, 1879)
Pempeliella ardosiella (Ragonot, 1887)
Phycita diaphana (Staudinger, 1870)
Phycitodes albatella (Ragonot, 1887)
Phycitodes inquinatella (Ragonot, 1887)
Phycitodes lacteella (Rothschild, 1915)
Phycitodes saxicola (Vaughan, 1870)
Plodia interpunctella (Hübner, 1813)
Psorosa mediterranella Amsel, 1953
Pyralis farinalis (Linnaeus, 1758)
Pyralis manihotalis Guenee, 1854
Raphimetopus ablutella (Zeller, 1839)
Staudingeria brunneella Chrétien, 1911
Thylacoptila paurosema Meyrick, 1888

Scythrididae
Scythris arachnodes Walsingham, 1908
Scythris boseanella Klimesch, 1986
Scythris fasciatella (Ragonot, 1880)
Scythris guimarensis Bengtsson, 1997
Scythris hierroella Klimesch, 1986
Scythris klimeschi Bengtsson, 1997
Scythris petrella Walsingham, 1908
Scythris pinkeri Klimesch, 1986
Scythris polycarpaeae Klimesch, 1986
Scythris pseudoarachnodes Bengtsson, 1997

Sesiidae
Bembecia handiensis Ramisch, 1997
Bembecia vulcanica (Pinker, 1969)

Sphingidae
Acherontia atropos (Linnaeus, 1758)
Agrius convolvuli (Linnaeus, 1758)
Hippotion celerio (Linnaeus, 1758)
Hyles livornica (Esper, 1780)
Hyles tithymali (Boisduval, 1834)
Macroglossum stellatarum (Linnaeus, 1758)

Stathmopodidae
Neomariania rebeli (Walsingham, 1894)

Tineidae
Amphixystis undosa (Walsingham, 1908)
Ateliotum insulare (Rebel, 1896)
Ateliotum petrinella (Herrich-Schäffer, 1854)
Cephimallota crassiflavella Bruand, 1851
Haplotinea insectella (Fabricius, 1794)
Infurcitinea toechophila (Walsingham, 1908)
Metatinea immaculatella (Rebel, 1892)
Monopis crocicapitella (Clemens, 1859)
Monopis imella (Hübner, 1813)
Monopis nigricantella (Milliere, 1872)
Myrmecozela ataxella (Chretien, 1905)
Nemapogon palmella (Chretien, 1908)
Niditinea fuscella (Linnaeus, 1758)
Oinophila nesiotes Walsingham, 1908
Oinophila v-flava (Haworth, 1828)
Opogona sacchari (Bojer, 1856)
Phereoeca allutella (Rebel, 1892)
Praeacedes atomosella (Walker, 1863)
Proterospastis merdella (Zeller, 1847)
Rhodobates canariensis Petersen & Gaedike, 1979
Rhodobates pinkeri Petersen, 1987
Setomorpha rutella Zeller, 1852
Stathmopolitis tragocoprella Walsingham, 1908
Stenoptinea cyaneimarmorella (Milliere, 1854)
Tenaga nigripunctella (Haworth, 1828)
Tinea basifasciella Ragonot, 1895
Tinea dubiella Stainton, 1859
Tinea messalina Robinson, 1979
Tinea murariella Staudinger, 1859
Tinea pellionella Linnaeus, 1758
Tinea trinotella Thunberg, 1794
Tineola bisselliella (Hummel, 1823)
Trichophaga bipartitella (Ragonot, 1892)
Trichophaga robinsoni Gaedike & Karsholt, 2001
Trichophaga tapetzella (Linnaeus, 1758)
Wegneria panchalcella (Staudinger, 1871)

Tischeriidae
Coptotriche longiciliatella (Rebel, 1896)
Coptotriche tantalella (Walsingham, 1908)

Tortricidae
Acroclita guanchana Walsingham, 1908
Acroclita klimeschi Diakonoff, 1985
Acroclita sonchana Walsingham, 1908
Acroclita subsequana (Herrich-Schäffer, 1851)
Aethes bilbaensis (Rossler, 1877)
Aethes conversana (Walsingham, 1908)
Aethes francillana (Fabricius, 1794)
Avaria constanti (Rebel, 1894)
Avaria hyerana (Milliere, 1858)
Bactra bactrana (Kennel, 1901)
Bactra lancealana (Hübner, 1799)
Bactra venosana (Zeller, 1847)
Bactra legitima Meyrick, 1911
Bactra minima Meyrick, 1909
Choristoneura bracatana (Rebel, 1894)
Choristoneura simonyi (Rebel, 1892)
Clavigesta sylvestrana (Curtis, 1850)
Clepsis canariensis (Rebel, 1896)
Clepsis coriacanus (Rebel, 1894)
Cnephasia asseclana (Denis & Schiffermuller, 1775)
Cnephasia fragosana (Zeller, 1847)
Cnephasia longana (Haworth, 1811)
Cnephasia nesiotica Razowski, 1983
Cochylimorpha decolorella (Zeller, 1839)
Cochylimorpha straminea (Haworth, 1811)
Cochylis epilinana Duponchel, 1842
Crocidosema plebejana Zeller, 1847
Cydia alazon (Diakonoff, 1976)
Cydia atlantica Chambon & Ferot, 1985
Cydia canariensis (Kuznetsov, 1972)
Cydia duplicana (Zetterstedt, 1839)
Cydia elpore (Diakonoff, 1976)
Cydia negatana (Rebel, 1896)
Cydia pomonella (Linnaeus, 1758)
Diceratura roseofasciana (Mann, 1855)
Endothenia pauperculana (Staudinger, 1859)
Epinotia thapsiana (Zeller, 1847)
Eupoecilia sanguisorbana (Herrich-Schäffer, 1856)
Lobesia neptunia (Walsingham, 1908)
Phtheochroa ecballiella Huemer, 1990
Phtheochroa syrtana Ragonot, 1888
Rhyacionia walsinghami (Rebel, 1896)
Selania leplastriana (Curtis, 1831)
Selania macella Diakonoff, 1976
Spilonota ocellana (Denis & Schiffermuller, 1775)
Strepsicrates fenestrata Walsingham, 1908
Strepsicrates trimaura Diakonoff, 1985
Thiodia glandulosana Walsingham, 1908

Yponomeutidae
Yponomeuta gigas Rebel, 1892
Yponomeuta padella (Linnaeus, 1758)
Zelleria oleastrella (Milliere, 1864)
Zelleria wolffi Klimesch, 1983

External links
Systematic List of the Butterflies of the Canary Islands. Archived from the original August 10, 2018.
Fauna Europaea

Lepidoptera
Cape Verde
Canary Islands
Canary Islands
Canary Islands
Canary
Canary
Canary Islands
Lepidoptera